Jag saknar dig ibland is a song written by Bobby Ljunggren and Henrik Wikström, and with lyrics by Ingela "Pling" Forsman, and originally performed by Ainbusk at Melodifestivalen 2008, where it ended up 6th in the semifinal in Linköping on 23 February 2008. The single peaked at 36th position at the Swedish singles chart.

The song was also tested for Svensktoppen on 9 March 2008, but failed to enter the chart. It got a new chance the upcoming week, but once again it failed to enter the chart.

Kristian Luuk performed the song during the Andra chansen act, referring to comedian Björn Gustafsson not being present in the pause acts. Even a music video was recorded.

Charts

References

External links
Information at Svensk mediedatabas

2008 songs
2008 singles
Pop ballads
Swedish-language songs
Melodifestivalen songs of 2008
Songs written by Bobby Ljunggren
Songs written by Henrik Wikström
Songs with lyrics by Ingela Forsman
Ainbusk songs